Tomoyo Linux (stylised as TOMOYO Linux) is a Linux kernel security module which implements mandatory access control (MAC).

Overview
Tomoyo Linux is a MAC implementation for Linux that can be used to increase the security of a system, while also being useful purely as a systems analysis tool. It was launched in March 2003 and was sponsored by NTT Data Corporation until March 2012.

Tomoyo Linux focuses on system behaviour. Tomoyo Linux allows each process to declare behaviours and resources needed to achieve their purpose. When protection is enabled, Tomoyo Linux restricts each process to the behaviours and resources allowed by the administrator.

Features
The main features of Tomoyo Linux include:

System analysis
Increased security through Mandatory Access Control
Automatic policy generation
Simple syntax
Ease of use

History and versions
Tomoyo was merged in Linux Kernel mainline version 2.6.30 (2009, June 10)/ It is currently one of four standard Linux Security Modules (LSM), along with SELinux, AppArmor and SMACK.

The Tomoyo Linux project started as a patch for the Linux kernel to provide MAC. Porting Tomoyo Linux to the mainline Linux kernel required the introduction of hooks into the LSM that had been designed and developed specifically to support SELinux and its label-based approach.

However, more hooks are needed to integrate the remaining MAC functionality of Tomoyo Linux. Consequently, the project is following two parallel development lines:

References

External links
Comparison chart of 1.x and 2.x
Comparison chart of Tomoyo 1.x, 2.x, and Akari
Tomoyo Linux project
Tomoyo Linux at Embedded Linux Wiki
LWN : Tomoyo Linux and pathname-based security
Tomoyo – Debian Wiki
Tomoyo Linux – ArchWiki

Linux security software
Linux kernel features
Nippon Telegraph and Telephone